Josefův Důl is a municipality and village in Jablonec nad Nisou District in the Liberec Region of the Czech Republic. It has about 900 inhabitants.

Administrative parts
Villages of Antonínov, Dolní Maxov and Karlov are administrative parts of Josefův Důl.

Geography
It lies in the southeastern part of the Jizera Mountains and in the eponymous protected landscape area.

The village is situated in the valley of the Kamenice River. Other watercourses in the municipality include the Jedlová Stream, which flows through the Jedlový důl nature reserve, and the streams Červený, Jelení, Pekelný and Hluboký. Due to the rugged terrain there are multiple waterfalls in the area. Josefův Důl Reservoir, located in the northwestern part of the municipal territory, was built on the Kamenice in 1976–1982.

History
Around 1690, Count Maximilian II Desfours-Walderode settled the area with German immigrants. The village of Karlov was founded in 1700 and Josefův Důl was founded in 1701, and both villages were named after Maximilian's newborn son, Karl Josef Desfours-Walderode. Dolní Maxov was founded in 1670 and named after Albrecht Maximilian Desfours-Walderode. The livelihood of the inhabitants of the villages was glassmaking, grinding and herding. The first glassworks was built in the 17th century.

The Munich Agreement permitted Nazi Germany to annex the area in 1938 and administer it as part of Reichsgau Sudetenland. Shortly thereafter Karlov was dissolved becoming Horní Maxov and Antonínov. Josefův Důl and Dolní Maxov formed a new municipality named Josefodol. Following World War II, in 1945, the municipality was returned to Czechoslovakia and the German inhabitants were expelled under the terms of Beneš decrees.

Transport

There is a railway station in Josefův Důl. The Josefův Důl–Smržovka local railway starts here.

Sport
Known as "the gateway to Jizera Mountains", Josefův Důl is a popular destination for skiers, hikers and cyclists. There is a small ski resort.

Sights

It was built in the pseudo-Gothic style in 1862–1865. The interior fittings house three valuable altar paintings by Wilhelm Kandler.

The Chapel of the Visitation of the Virgin Mary in Karlov was built in the Baroque style in 1803 and rebuilt into its current form in 1865. It replaced an old wooden chapel from 1762.

Notable people
Gustav Leutelt (1860–1947), poet and writer
Fidelio F. Finke (1891–1968), composer

References

External links

Tourist portal

Villages in Jablonec nad Nisou District